The Miller Farmstead near La Crosse, Kansas in Rush County, Kansas was established  in 1880–1881.  It was listed on the National Register of Historic Places in 2012.

It was established east of La Crosse in 1881.

Austrian immigrant Frank Miller and wife Emma homesteaded a  property under the Homestead Act of 1862 and an additional area of the same size under the Timber Culture Act of 1873. They were required to plant  of
timber which they did.

For a homestead listing, it was unusual that the farm had so many buildings and structures, 19 in total (11 deemed contributing), as none had ever been removed in the farm's history. The buildings and structures were varied in their construction, and had exteriors that were stone, wood, hollow clay tile, metal and vinyl.

The original house built in 1880-81 and later modified was deemed non-contributing due to addition of non-historic vinyl siding, but it was noted it might later be recognized as contributing if the siding was removed.

It is located at 2913 Kansas Highway 4, on the north side of the highway.

Notes

References

External links

Barns on the National Register of Historic Places in Kansas
National Register of Historic Places in Rush County, Kansas
Buildings and structures completed in 1881